Lara Goodall (born 26 April 1996) is a South African cricketer who represents South Africa in Women's One Day Internationals and Women's Twenty20 Internationals. In February 2019, Cricket South Africa named her as one of the players in the Powerade Women's National Academy intake for 2019. In September 2019, she was named in the M van der Merwe XI squad for the inaugural edition of the Women's T20 Super League in South Africa. On 23 July 2020, Goodall was named in South Africa's 24-woman squad to begin training in Pretoria, ahead of their tour to England.

In February 2022, she was named in South Africa's team for the 2022 Women's Cricket World Cup in New Zealand. In June 2022, Goodall was named in South Africa's Women's Test squad for their one-off match against England Women. She made her Test debut on 27 June 2022, for South Africa against England. In July 2022, she was named in South Africa's team for the cricket tournament at the 2022 Commonwealth Games in Birmingham, England.

References

Further reading

External links
 
 

1996 births
Living people
South African women cricketers
South Africa women Test cricketers
South Africa women One Day International cricketers
South Africa women Twenty20 International cricketers
Western Province women cricketers
Cricketers at the 2022 Commonwealth Games
Commonwealth Games competitors for South Africa